Charles Walton may refer to:

 Charles Walton (inventor) (1921–2011), first patent holder for the RFID device
 Charles Walton (murder victim) (1870–1945), British murder victim
 Charles A. Walton (Toronto politician), Toronto councillor
 Charles A. Walton (Indiana politician) (1936–1996), Indiana lawyer and politician  
 Charles W. Walton (Maine politician) (1819–1900), member of the US House of Representatives from Maine
 Charles W. Walton (New York politician) (1875–1945), New York state senator